Sublink Network was a non-profit association founded in Italy in 1989 to allow cost-sharing access to the Internet. Sublink Network was registered with the sublink.org domain (this domain now belongs to one of the founders). Sublink Network had its own sublink.* newsgroup hierarchy and a gateway with the Italian branch of FidoNet.

History
Its founders on September 25, 1989 were: Paolo Ventafridda (president), Paolo Pennisi, Marco Sacchi, Carlo Vellano, Davide Yachaya and Mauro Mozzarelli. The association was based in Milan, Italy.
The association for a few years had a UUCP dialup link to Rutgers university, but later obtained free support from Olivetti who provided Internet mail and newsgroups (now named "groups" by google) feed.  At its peak in 1991-1995 Sublink Network counted around one hundred nodes distributed across the Italian territory.

Sublink was the very first public (non-academic) internet email and newsgroup network in Italy, with very low access fees (around $100 a year), fast backbone modems running at 19200 bps (the average modem was 2400 bit/s at that time), and fully registered to the NIC. When after 1997, low cost PPP commercial access to the Internet started to become available, interest for UUCP cost-share Internet feeds started to decline and the association was naturally dissolved.

References

UUCP network map for the early internet in Italy 
Early public networking analysis by the Italian National Research Center, 1993 (pdf, Italian)

Internet access
Non-profit organisations based in Italy
Organizations established in 1989